I, Tintin (French: Moi, Tintin) is a Franco-Belgian film which premiered in the Paris cinema as a feature presentation in 1976. 
It is made in semidocumentary style and mixing interviews with The Adventures of Tintin creator Hergé with real historical events and news stories edited together with animated Adventures of Tintin clips, narrated by Belgian news correspondent, Gérard Valet.
The film was produced by Belvision Studios and Pierre Films in cooperation with the Franco-Belgian Ministry of Culture (Ministère de la Culture Française de Belgique).

VHS and DVD release
A VHS was released in French, and it was released on DVD in 2007 in a double pack with Tintin et Moi, released by Madman Entertainment.  It included an interview with Michael Serres, a short film called "The Secret of the Clear Line" and a menu-based Hergé biography.

References

External links

1976 animated films
1976 films
1970s French animated films
1976 documentary films
Documentary films about comics
1970s French-language films
Tintin films
Works about Tintin
French documentary films
Films with live action and animation
Belgian animated films
French animated fantasy films
Belgian documentary films
Animated documentary films